Amin Dora (born 1980 in Zahle, Lebanon) is a film director, visual artist and professor at the Lebanese Academy of Fine Arts. In 2010, he directed the first Arabic web drama series, Shankaboot, winner of the Digital Emmy Award.

Career
Dora's film career began with his stop motion animated short film Greyscale, which won the audience award at the Zinebi - Bilbao International Documentary and Short Film Festival. In 2011, he won a Digital Emmy Award for Shankaboot, the world's first Arabic web series. Composed of 5-minute episodes, the series explores ways of portraying real life in Beirut through the eyes of 15-year-old delivery boy. His next project, Undocumented: Bidune Kaid, is an interactive drama specifically designed for social media and internet viewing. In the course of the episodes, that last from two to five minutes each, the viewer is allowed to choose the storyline. Created by Syrian artist Rafi Wahbi, the story follows three Syrian separate characters in their journey of self discovery amidst civil war.

Ghadi, Dora's debut feature film, premiered in 2013 at the Busan International Film Festival and received the prestigious KNN Audience Award. Following its release, the film was selected as the Lebanese entry for the Best Foreign Language Film at the 86th Academy Awards. In 2014, the film is recipient of the Murex d'Or for Best Lebanese Film and won the audience award at the International Filmfestival Mannheim-Heidelberg in Germany.

In 2021, Dora is director of Shahid series Hell’s Gate, the world's first Arabic sci fi action drama, set in Beirut in the year 2052.

Filmography

Awards and nominations

References

External links 

Amin Dora official site

Lebanese film directors
People from Zahle
Living people
1980 births